Rapid transit systems operate in six major South Korean cities, except for Ulsan and Sejong.

Currently operational

Seoul Capital Area

Metropolitan Rail
Korail operates the following commuter lines: Bundang Line, Gyeongchun Line, Gyeongui–Jungang Line, Suin Line, Gyeonggang Line, and parts of metro lines Line 1, Line 3, Line 4.
Korail Airport Railroad operates AREX
NeoTrans operates Shinbundang Line
E-Rail operates Seohae Line
Urban Rail
Seoul Metro operates Line 2, Line 5, Line 6, Line 7, Line 8, and parts of lines Line 1, Line 3, Line 4, and Line 9 Second Extension.
Seoul Metro Line9 (a joint venture between Veolia Transport and Hyundai Rotem) operates Line 9 First Extension
Incheon Transit operates the whole Incheon subway system (I1 & I2).
 Light Metro Rail
Uijeongbu Light Rail operates U Line 
Yongin Rapid Transit operates EverLine
UI trans operates Ui LRT

Busan-Ulsan-Gyeongnam Area

Metropolitan Rail
Korail operates the following commuter line: Donghae
Urban Rail
Busan Transportation operates lines 1, 2, 3, and 4
Light Metro Rail
B&G Metro operates the Busan–Gimhae light rail

Daegu-Gyeongbuk Area

Daegu Metropolitan Transit operates the whole subway system.

Daejeon

Daejeon Metropolitan Express Transit operates the whole subway system.

Gwangju

Gwangju Metropolitan Rapid Transit operates the whole subway system.

Proposed awaiting for approval
 Ui LRT extension - 3.50 km
 Seoul Subway Line 9 Phase IV- 3.80 km

See also
 Transportation in South Korea

External links
Subway transferring information for South Korea (in Japanese)